From Impressionism To Anime: Japan As Fantasy And Fan Cult In The Western Imagination is a scholarly book by Susan J. Napier published in 2007 by Palgrave Macmillan. It connects Japanophilia, Orientalism, Japonisme and modern anime and manga fandom.

Reception
Anime News Network's Mikhail Koulikov commends the book for making "interesting but logical assertions about the reasons behind the popularity of anime in America. Claims and inferences are well supported by both specific examples and references." However, he criticises the book for "too much reliance on interviews raises issues of ignoring other viewpoints." Rayna Denison from University of East Anglia, writing for Participations comments that Napier's "account is more epochal than holistic, and its account of Japanese-Western engagements is one more concerned with French, American and some British points of contact, rather than with mapping a full history of Japanese-Western relationships."

References

External links
Pacific Affairs review
Project MUSE

2007 non-fiction books
Books about anime
Palgrave Macmillan books